Trgovište is a town and municipality located in the Pčinja District of southern Serbia. According to 2011 census, the population of the town is 1,785, while population of the municipality is 5,091.

Settlements

Aside from the town of Trgovište, the municipality includes the following settlements:

 Babina Poljana
 Barbace
 Vladovce
 Goločevac
 Gornovac
 Gornja Trnica
 Gornji Kozji Dol
 Gornji Stajevac
 Dejance
 Donja Trnica
 Donji Kozji Dol
 Donji Stajevac
 Dumbija
 Đerekarce
 Zladovce
 Kalovo
 Lesnica
 Mala Reka
 Margance
 Mezdraja
 Novi Glog
 Novo Selo
 Petrovac
 Prolesje
 Radovnica
 Rajčevce
 Surlica
 Crveni Grad
 Crna Reka
 Crnovce
 Šajince
 Šaprance
 Široka Planina
 Šumata Trnica

Demographics

The ethnic composition of the municipality:

Notable people
 Mojsije I
 Krsta Kovačević, Chetnik soldier
 Stojan Koruba, Chetnik soldier
 Čakr-paša, Hajduk soldier

See also
 List of places in Serbia
 Targovishte
 Târgoviște

References

External links 

 

Populated places in Pčinja District
Municipalities and cities of Southern and Eastern Serbia